The Indian locomotive class WAP-1 is a class of 25 kV AC electric locomotives that was developed in 1980 by Chittaranjan Locomotive Works for Indian Railways. The model name stands for broad gauge (W), AC Current (A), Passenger traffic (P) engine, 1st generation (1). They entered service in late 1981. A total of 65 WAP-1 were built at CLW between 1980 and 1996, which made them the most numerous class of mainline electric passenger locomotive until its successor, the WAP-4.

The WAP-1 is India's first dedicated electric passenger locomotive of Indian Railways serving passenger trains for over 42 years. This class provided the basic design for a number of other locomotives like WAP-3 and WAP-4 models. However, with the advent of new 3-phase locomotives like WAP-5 and WAP-7, the WAP-1 locomotives were relegated to hauling smaller express and passenger trains and now the aging fleet the WAP-1 locomotives are being slowly withdrawn from mainline duties and scrapped.

As of June 2022, 55 locomotives still retain "operational status" on the mainline as WAP-1, with further examples having been converted to WAP-4.

Development

Background
In the early 1980s, Indian Railways began considering developing a passenger version of its WAM-4 class... Designed for both passenger and goods trains the WAM-4 was one of the most successful locomotives of the 1970s and a mainstay of the Indian Railways.

Five prototype locomotives of this type were ordered from CLW to the design of RDSO. The first prototype locomotive was put into service in 1981. They were first used on the Howrah Rajdhani Express.

The locomotive is powered by six axle-hungs, nose-suspended forced ventilated type DC traction motors. Speed control is achieved by grouping in 2S-3P combination and by field weakening of the motor. It utilises a silicon rectifier for conversion of AC power into DC.

They are being converted to make them suitable for multiple operation. Compressed air brake for the locomotives and vacuum brake for the train are provided. The brake system is being modified to make them suitable for dual brakes.

The WAP-1 provided the basis for the WAP-4.

Variants 

The WAP-3 is the upgraded variant of the WAP-1 with better top speed. All units of this class were WAP-1 units already in service. The first locomotive converted was a WAP-1 '22005' named Jawahar. Subsequently 8 more WAP-1 were converted, But since the class were not a great success and had performance issues these were converted back to WAP-1.

Image gallery

Locomotive sheds

See also

Rail transport in India#History
Indian Railways
Locomotives of India
Rail transport in India

References

External links 

Electric Locomotive Roster: The WAP Series!
[IRFCA] Indian Railways FAQ: Locomotives—Specific classes : AC Electric
[IRFCA] Indian Railways FAQ: Diesel and Electric Locomotive Specifications
11081 Colour Photographs, Indian Railways

25 kV AC locomotives
Co-Co locomotives
Electric locomotives of India
Railway locomotives introduced in 1980
5 ft 6 in gauge locomotives
Chittaranjan Locomotive Works locomotives